Greig Young (born 24 December 1959), is a Scottish retired football goalkeeper.

Young signed for Clyde in 1978, and made over 100 appearances for the club in his 6-year spell. He left in 1984 to join Whitley Bay.

External links

Living people
1959 births
Clyde F.C. players
Scottish footballers
People from Girvan
Scottish Football League players
Whitley Bay F.C. players
Association football goalkeepers
Footballers from South Ayrshire